Meg Hutchins (born 3 February 1982) is an Australian rules footballer who played for the Collingwood Football Club in the AFL Women's (AFLW).

Early life and state football
In her early teens, she reverted to other sports when football was no longer an option due to league rules and a lack of girls' sides. She played hockey and basketball before becoming an elite rower. At the age of 21, she returned to football with VWFL club Eastern Devils, and was their leading goalkicker between 2005 and 2008, before switching to defence and playing as a key defender for eight seasons. She represented  in four exhibition matches. While playing for them against Western Australia in early June at Etihad Stadium, she tore the lateral meniscus in her right knee, leading to her not playing for the rest of the season.

During her time at the Eastern Devils, Hutchins was also co-captain of the club, won the Helen Lambert Medal as the VWFL best and fairest, and was selected as All-Australian six times.

In May 2017, after returning to the Eastern Devils for the off-season between the 2017 and 2018 AFLW seasons, Hutchins made her 200th appearance for the club.

AFL Women's career

In March 2016, Collingwood chief executive officer Gary Pert was approached by Hutchins, who offered the benefit of her experience and acted as an advisor to the Collingwood board, supervising the recruitment and development of players, coaches and staff. Collingwood created a job for her, named Women's Football Operations Manager.

In August 2016, Hutchins joined  as a priority pick, fulfilling her childhood dream of playing for Collingwood in the AFL. She made her debut in round 1, 2017, in the inaugural AFLW match at IKON Park against . Following the match, she said that Collingwood were "outworked" by Carlton with them winning the handballs count. She also spoke of the mixed emotions, as on one hand, as a competitor, she was bitterly disappointed with the loss but on the other hand, as a female footballer, she was incredibly proud of what begun.

Collingwood re-signed Hutchins for the 2018 season during the trade period in May 2017.

She was delisted by Collingwood at the end of the 2018 season after the club announced they would not give her a contract for the 2019 season, she subsequently joined 's Victorian Football League Women's team. Hutchins announced her retirement as an AFLW player on 12 June 2018, but will continue with Hawthorn in the VFLW.

International rules football
Hutchins was a member of the Australia women's international rules football team that played against Ireland in the 2006 Ladies' International Rules Series.

Statistics
Statistics are correct to the end of the 2018 season.

|- style="background-color: #eaeaea"
! scope="row" style="text-align:center" | 2017
|style="text-align:center;"|
| 25 || 7 || 0 || 0 || 57 || 13 || 70 || 16 || 8 || 0.0 || 0.0 || 8.1 || 1.9 || 10.0 || 2.3 || 1.1
|- 
! scope="row" style="text-align:center" | 2018
|style="text-align:center;"|
| 25 || 5 || 3 || 1 || 22 || 9 || 31 || 8 || 6 || 0.6 || 0.2 || 4.4 || 1.8 || 6.2 || 1.6 || 1.2
|- class="sortbottom"
! colspan=3| Career
! 12
! 3
! 1
! 79
! 22
! 101
! 24
! 14
! 0.3
! 0.1
! 6.6
! 1.8
! 8.4
! 2.0
! 1.2
|}

References

External links

 
 Sports TG Profile

Living people
1982 births
Collingwood Football Club (AFLW) players
Australian rules footballers from Melbourne
Sportswomen from Victoria (Australia)
Australia women's international rules football team players
Victorian Women's Football League players